Jack Davis (September 6, 1935 – February 4, 2018) was a Republican member of the Illinois House of Representatives from 1976 to 1986, and a member of the U.S. House of Representatives from 1987 to 1989 representing Illinois' 4th U.S. Congressional District.

Biography
Davis was born in Chicago, Illinois, on September 6, 1935, to Edna (née Haflei) and Russell Bender. His biological father died when he was a child and his mother got remarried to Melcher "M.C." Davis, who adopted Jack. He entered Southern Illinois University at age 15 and received a Bachelor of Arts degree in 1956. He attended Naval Officer Candidate School and served in the United States Navy as a Lieutenant from 1956 to 1959, flying EC-121 between Midway Island and Alaska. He married Virginia "Ginny" Griffin of Shelbyville, Illinois, with whom he had three children.

From 1959 to 1978, Davis owned and operated a steel warehouse business. A Republican, he served in the Illinois House of Representatives from 1977 to 1987. In 1986, Davis was elected to the U.S. House, and he served one term, 1987 to 1989. He was an unsuccessful candidate for reelection in 1988, losing to the Democratic candidate, George E. Sangmeister.

Davis served as Assistant Secretary of the Air Force for Manpower, Readiness and Resources from 1990 to 1992; he was awarded the Meritorious Service Medal for activities in northern Iraq during Operations Desert Shield and Desert Storm. In the early to mid 2000s, Davis hosted a radio show, Davis and Company, on 970 WMAY in Springfield, Illinois. Davis died on February 4, 2018, at his home in Springfield, Illinois.

References

External links

 

1935 births
2018 deaths
Republican Party members of the Illinois House of Representatives
Politicians from Chicago
Politicians from Springfield, Illinois
Southern Illinois University alumni
Businesspeople from Illinois
Military personnel from Illinois
Radio personalities from Illinois
United States Department of Defense officials
United States Naval Aviators
American adoptees
American steel industry businesspeople
Deaths from dementia in Illinois
Republican Party members of the United States House of Representatives from Illinois
20th-century American businesspeople